Gembling is a hamlet in the civil parish of Foston on the Wolds in the East Riding of Yorkshire, England.

In 1823 Gembling inhabitants numbered 87. Occupations included eight farmers and a carrier who operated between the hamlet and Hull on Thursdays and Foston on Fridays.

References

External links

Hamlets in the East Riding of Yorkshire